This is a list of the described species of the harvestman family Assamiidae. The data is taken from Joel Hallan's Biology Catalog.

Many of Roewer's subfamilies are unsupported, as the relationships in this family await further research.

Aburistinae
Aburistinae — Roewer, 1935

 Aburista — Roewer, Yahia Mustafa
 Aburista termitarum — Roewer, 1935 — Ghana

 Aburistella — Lawrence, 1947
 Aburistella flava — Lawrence, 1947

 Bancoella — Lawrence, 1947
 Bancoella bimaculata — Lawrence, 1947

 Banconyx — Lawrence, 1947
 Banconyx dentichelis — Lawrence, 1947

 Sokodea — Roewer, 1935
 Sokodea caeca — Roewer, 1935

 Typhlobunellus — Roewer, 1927
 Typhlobunellus formicarum — Roewer, 1927
 Typhlobunellus platypalpis — Lawrence, 1947

 Typhloburista — Lawrence, 1947
 Typhloburista pusilla — Lawrence, 1947

Acacinae
Acacinae — Roewer, 1935

 Acaca — Roewer, 1935
 Acaca albatra — Roewer, 1935
 Acaca liobuniformis — (Caporiacco, 1949) — Ethiopia

 Acanthacaca — Roewer, 1952
 Acanthacaca katumbea — Roewer, 1961
 Acanthacaca upembensis — Roewer, 1952

Assamiinae
Assamiinae — Sørensen, 1884

 Afroassamia — Caporiacco, 1940
 Afroassamia laevipes — Caporiacco, 1940

 Anassamia — Roewer, 1935
 Assamia — Sørensen, 1884
 Assamia aborensis — Roewer, 1913 — India (Assam)
 Assamia bituberculata — Thorell, 1889 — Burma
 Assamia gravelyi — Roewer, 1911 — Sri Lanka
 Assamia pectinata — Roewer, 1912 — Burma
 Assamia rufa — Roewer, 1927
 Assamia westermanni — Sørensen, 1884 — India (Assam)

 Assamiella — Roewer, 1923
 Assamiella marginata — (Roewer, 1912) — Burma

 Assaphalla — Martens, 1977
 Assaphalla peralata — Martens, 1977

 Dawnabius — Roewer, 1935
 Dawnabius pectinatus — 

 Gomezyta — Roewer, 1935
 Gomezyta africana — Roewer, 1935

 Gudalura — Roewer, 1927
 Gudalura biseriata — Roewer, 1927

 Metassamia — Roewer, 1923
 Metassamia bihemisphaerica — Thailand
 Metassamia bituberculata — (Roewer, 1912) — Darjiling
 Metassamia furcidens — Roewer, 1935 — Assam
 Metassamia nepalica — Martens, 1977
 Metassamia reticulata — (Simon, 1887) — Burma
 Metassamia septemdentata — Roewer, 1923 — Assam
 Metassamia sexdentata — (Thorell, 1889) — Burma
 Metassamia soerensenii — (Thorell, 1889) — Burma
 Metassamia spinifrons — (Roewer, 1915) — Sikkim
 Metassamia variata — Sørensen, 1932 — India

 Micrassamula — Martens, 1977
 Micrassamula thak — Martens, 1977
 Micrassamula jumlensis — Martens, 1977

 Neassamia — Roewer, 1935
 Neassamia siamensis — Roewer, 1935 — Thailand

 Nepalsia — Martens, 1977
 Nepalsia rhododendron — Martens, 1977
 Nepalsia betula — Martens, 1977
 Nepalsia picea — Martens, 1977

 Nepalsioides — Martens, 1977
 Nepalsioides thodunga — Martens, 1977
 Nepalsioides angusta — Martens, 1977

 Parassamia — Roewer, 1935
 Parassamia sexdentata — Roewer, 1935 — India
 Parassamia albimarginata — Roewer, 1940 — Burma

 Pechota — Roewer, 1935
 Pechota marginalis — Roewer, 1935 — Malacca

 Popassamia — Roewer, 1940
 Popassamia heinrichi — Roewer, 1940 — Burma

 Puria — Roewer, 1923
 Puria dorsalis — (Roewer, 1914) — India (Maharashtra)

 Tavoybia — Roewer, 1935
 Tavoybia quadrispina — Roewer, 1935 — Malacca

 Umtaliella — Lawrence, 1934
 Umtaliella rhodesiensis — Lawrence, 1934 — Zimbabwe

Dampetrinae
Dampetrinae — Sørensen, in L. Koch 1886

 Apygoplus — Roewer, 1912
 Apygoplus longipes — (Roewer, 1911) — New Guinea
 Apygoplus bulbigerus — Roewer, 1913 — New Guinea
 Apygoplus marginatus — Roewer, 1915 — New Guinea

 Cadomea — Roewer, 1940
 Cadomea longitudinalis — Roewer, 1940

 Dampetrellus — Roewer, 1927
 Dampetrellus scaber — Roewer, 1927

 Dampetrus — Karsch, 1880
 Dampetrus australis — Karsch, 1880
 Dampetrus cristatus — Sørensen, in L. Koch 1886 — New South Wales
 Dampetrus geniculatus — Sørensen, in L. Koch 1886
 Dampetrus gracilis — Forster, 1949 — Victoria
 Dampetrus granulatus — Sørensen, in L. Koch 1886 — Queensland
 Dampetrus isolatus — Shear, 2001 — western Australia
 Dampetrus soerenseni — Forster, 1955

 Dongmolla — Roewer, 1927
 Dongmolla silvestrii — Roewer, 1927

 Dunkeriana — Roewer, 1912
 Dunkeriana neoguinensis — Roewer, 1912 — New Guinea
 Dunkeriana borneensis — Roewer, 1935 — Borneo

 Euwintonius — Roewer, 1923
 Euwintonius continentalis — Roewer, 1923 — Australia
 Euwintonius insulanus — Roewer, 1940 — Bismarck Archipelago?, New Guinea
 Euwintonius thaiensis — S. Suzuki, 1985 — Thailand

 Granobunus — Roewer, 1912
 Granobunus ferruguineus — Roewer, 1912 — New Guinea

 Heteropygoplus — Roewer, 1923
 Heteropygoplus sublaevis — (Roewer, 1915) — New Guinea

 Hyamus — Thorell, 1891
 Hyamus formosus — Thorell, 1891 — Sumatra

 Macrodampetrus — Roewer, 1915
 Macrodampetrus bicoloripes — Roewer, 1915 — New Guinea
 Macrodampetrus unicoloripes — Roewer, 1915 — New Guinea

 Mermerus — Thorell, 1876
 Mermerus beccari — Thorell, 1876 — Java
 Mermerus thorelli — Banks, 1931 — Borneo

 Metadampetrus — Roewer, 1915
 Metadampetrus sublaevis — Roewer, 1915 — New Guinea

 Metahyamus — Roewer, 1923
 Metahyamus jacobsoni — Roewer, 1923 — Simalur Island
 Metahyamus amoensis — Suzuki, 1969
 Metahyamus bicolor — Roewer, 1935 — Borneo
 Metahyamus sutepensis — S. Suzuki, 1985 — Thailand
 Metahyamus variedentatus — Suzuki, 1976

 Metamermerus — Roewer, 1920
 Metamermerus speculator — Roewer, 1920 — Queensland

 Metamosoia — Roewer, 1915
 Metamosoia echinata — Roewer, 1915 — New Guinea

 Metanothippus — Giltay, 1930
 Metanothippus bicolor — Giltay, 1930

 Mosoia — Roewer, 1912
 Mosoia albiceps — (Loman, 1906) — New Guinea
 Mosoia biarmata — Roewer, 1940 — New Guinea
 Mosoia bulbigera — Roewer, 1915 — New Guinea
 Mosoia gracillipes — Roewer, 1912 — New Guinea
 Mosoia saylori — Goodnight & Goodnight, 1947 — New Guinea

 Neonothippus — Roewer, 1912
 Neonothippus marginalis — Roewer, 1912 — New Guinea

 Nothippulus — Roewer, 1923
 Nothippulus atroluteus — (Roewer, 1912) — Vietnam

 Nothippus — Thorell, 1890
 Nothippus affinis — Loman, in Weber 1892 — Sumatra
 Nothippus limbatus — Thorell, 1890 — Sumatra
 Nothippus tigrinus — Roewer, 1935 — Malacca

 Octobunus — Roewer, 1923
 Octobunus singularis — Roewer, 1923 — Australia

 Pahangius — Roewer, 1935
 Pahangius fasciatus — Roewer, 1935 — Malacca

 Paradampetrus — Giltay, 1930
 Paradampetrus leopoldi — Giltay, 1930

 Paranothippus — Roewer, 1912
 Paranothippus singularis — Roewer, 1912 — New Guinea

 Sermowaius — Roewer, 1923
 Sermowaius neoguinensis — (Roewer, 1913) — New Guinea

 Simalurius — Roewer, 1923
 Simalurius jacobsoni — Roewer, 1923 — Indonesia
 Simalurius palawanensis — Suzuki, 1977

 Sudaria — Roewer, 1923
 Sudaria atrolutea — Roewer, 1935 — Sumatra
 Sudaria jacobsoni — Roewer, 1923 — Sumatra
 Sudaria sarasinorum — (Roewer, 1913) — Sulawesi
 Sudaria simaluris — Roewer, 1923 — Simalur Island

Erecinae
Erecinae — Roewer, 1935

 Erecomma — Roewer, 1940
 Erecomma laurenti — Roewer, 1961
 Erecomma montana — Roewer, 1940

 Erecongoa — Roewer, 1950
 Erecongoa gracilis — Roewer, 1950
 Erecongoa granulata — Roewer, 1952

 Erecops — Roewer, 1940
 Erecops multispina — Roewer, 1940

 Erecula — Roewer, 1935
 Erecula cincta — Roewer, 1961
 Erecula crassipes — H. Kauri, 1985 — Zaire
 Erecula leleupi — Lawrence, 1962
 Erecula marmorata — Roewer, 1940 — Tanzania
 Erecula novemdentata — Roewer, 1961
 Erecula pachypes — Roewer, 1935 — Zaire
 Erecula septemdentata — Lawrence, 1957

 Eregonda — Roewer, 1950
 Eregonda tenuis — Roewer, 1950

 Eubaeorix — Roewer, 1912
 Eubaeorix gravelyi — Roewer, 1912 — Burma

 Eupygoplus — Roewer, 1915
 Eupygoplus armatus — Roewer, 1915 — India
 Eupygoplus birmanicus — Roewer, 1936
 Eupygoplus gracilis — Roewer, 1927 — Bengal

 Fakoa — Roewer, 1923
 Fakoa spinulata — (Roewer, 1915) — Cameroon

 Gapotus — Roewer, 1935
 Gapotus frontalis — Roewer, 1935 — Malacca

 Irnia — Roewer, 1935
 Irnia scabra — Roewer, 1935

 Ivocoryphus — Lawrence, 1965
 Ivocoryphus jezequeli — Lawrence, 1965

 Izea — Roewer, 1927
 Izea armata — Roewer, 1935 — Cameroon
 Izea pectinata — Roewer, 1927 — São Tomé

 Kakontwea — Roewer, 1951
 Kakontwea leleupi — Roewer, 1951

 Kasaina — Lawrence, 1957
 Kasaina scabra — Lawrence, 1957

 Kukkala — Roewer, 1929
 Kukkala trispinifrons — Roewer, 1929 — India

 Kungwea — Roewer, 1961
 Kungwea scabra — Roewer, 1961

 Lawrenciola — Roewer, 1935
 Lawrenciola damarana — (Lawrence, 1931)
 Lawrenciola rhodesiana — (Lawrence, 1931)

 Lepchana — Roewer, 1927
 Lepchana spinipalpis — Roewer, 1927

 Lubudia — Roewer, 1951
 Lubudia leleupi — Roewer, 1951

 Lygippulus — Roewer, 1954
 Lygippulus major — Roewer, 1954
 Lygippulus nigrescens — Roewer, 1961
 Lygippulus parvulus — Roewer, 1954
 Lygippulus scaber — Roewer, 1954
 Lygippulus setipes — Roewer, 1961

 Lygippus — Roewer, 1940
 Lygippus abdominalis — Roewer, 1940
 Lygippus machadoi — Lawrence, 1951

 Maccabeesa — Roewer, 1936
 Maccabeesa lawrencei — Roewer, 1936

 Mandaria — Roewer, 1935
 Mandaria caeca — Roewer, 1935

 Merucola — Roewer, 1935
 Merucola granulatus — Roewer, 1935

 Aberdereca — Goodnight & Goodnight, 1959
 Aberdereca parva — Goodnight & Goodnight, 1959 — Kenya

 Acanthophrysella — Strand, 1911
 Acanthophrysella pectinata — (Loman, 1902) — Tanzania

 Allereca — Roewer, 1961
 Allereca ruandana — Roewer, 1961

 Angolyppa — Lawrence, 1957
 Angolyppa scabra — Lawrence, 1957

 Angopygoplus — Lawrence, 1951
 Angopygoplus dentichelis — Lawrence, 1951

 Anjolus — Goodnight & Goodnight, 1948
 Anjolus malkini — Goodnight & Goodnight, 1948

 Baeorix — Thorell, 1889
 Baeorix manducus — Thorell, 1889 — Burma

 Bambereca — H. Kauri, 1985
 Bambereca spinifrons — H. Kauri, 1985 — Zaire

 Bibundina — Roewer, 1935
 Bibundina pectinata — Roewer, 1935

 Binderia — Roewer, 1935
 Binderia spinarmata — Roewer, 1935

 Bolama — Roewer, 1927
 Bolama spinosa — Roewer, 1927

 Buemba — Roewer, 1935
 Buemba filipes — Roewer, 1935

 Bulobana — Roewer, 1935
 Bulobana infuscata — Roewer, 1940 — Tanzania
 Bulobana octopunctata — Roewer, 1935 — Zaire

 Bundukia — Lawrence, 1962
 Bundukia nigra — Lawrence, 1962

 Buniabia — Roewer, 1961
 Buniabia filipes — Roewer, 1961

 Callereca — Roewer, 1940
 Callereca angolensis — Lawrence, 1949 — Angola
 Callereca gracilis — Roewer, 1940 — Eastern Africa, Moshi
 Callereca teteana — Roewer, 1954

 Cardwella — Roewer, 1935
 Cardwella atar — (Sørensen, 1932) — Australia

 Cerea — Sørensen, 1896
 Cerea feai — Roewer, 1927 — Bioko, "French Congo"
 Cerea lugubris — Sørensen, 1896 — Cameroon

 Cereatta — Roewer, 1935
 Cereatta celeripes — (Loman, 1910) — Cameroon
 Cereatta elegans — Roewer, 1935 — Cameroon
 Cereatta kivuensis — Roewer, 1961

 Cereipes — Roewer, 1935
 Cereipes angusta — (Roewer, 1912) — Cameroon

 Cereodiscus — Roewer, 1940
 Cereodiscus lesserti — Roewer, 1940

 Cereoides — Roewer, 1935
 Cereoides nebulosa — (Sørensen, 1896) — Cameroon

 Chilon — Sørensen, 1896
 Chilon albatra — (Roewer, 1935) — Cameroon
 Chilon cinctus — Sørensen, 1896 — Cameroon
 Chilon horridus — (Roewer, 1912) — Cameroon
 Chilon laevituber — (Roewer, 1953)
 Chilon robustus — Sørensen, 1896 — Cameroon
 Chilon royi — (Roewer, 1961)
 Chilon salebrosus — (Karsch, 1879) — Western Africa
 Chilon scaber — Sørensen, 1896 — Cameroon
 Chilon villersi — (Roewer, 1953)

 Coleutus — Roewer, 1940
 Coleutus longipalpis — Roewer, 1940

 Comereca — Roewer, 1961
 Comereca rectipes — Roewer, 1961

 Cryptopygoplus — Lawrence, 1931
 Cryptopygoplus africanus — Lawrence, 1931 — South Africa
 Cryptopygoplus damaranus — Lawrence, 1931 — South Africa
 Cryptopygoplus rhodesianus — Lawrence, 1931 — South Africa

 Djemia — Roewer, 1935
 Djemia cooperi — Roewer, 1935

 Dodabetta — Roewer, 1929
 Dodabetta conigera — Roewer, 1929

 Ereala — Roewer, 1950
 Ereala armata — Roewer, 1950

 Erebalda — Roewer, 1940
 Erebalda cryptostigma — Roewer, 1940

 Ereca — Sørensen, 1910
 Ereca affinis — Sørensen, 1910 — Eastern Africa
 Ereca bengtsoni — H. Kauri, 1985 — Zaire
 Ereca calcanifera — H. Kauri, 1985 — Zaire
 Ereca fusca — H. Kauri, 1985 — Zaire
 Ereca imitatrix — H. Kauri, 1985 — Zaire
 Ereca itombwensis — H. Kauri, 1985 — Zaire
 Ereca kalimabengana — H. Kauri, 1985 — Zaire
 Ereca lata — Sørensen, 1910 — Eastern Africa
 Ereca lawrencei — H. Kauri, 1985 — Zaire
 Ereca loekenae — H. Kauri, 1985 — Zaire
 Ereca lyrifera — H. Kauri, 1985 — Zaire
 Ereca maculata — Roewer, 1913 — Eastern Africa
 Ereca modesta — Sørensen, 1910 — Eastern Africa
 Ereca mwengana — H. Kauri, 1985 — Zaire
 Ereca robusta — H. Kauri, 1985 — Zaire
 Ereca rufa — Sørensen, 1910 — Eastern Africa
 Ereca sangensis — H. Kauri, 1985 — Zaire
 Ereca silvatica — H. Kauri, 1985 — Zaire
 Ereca simulator — Sørensen, 1910 — Eastern Africa
 Ereca soerenseni — Lawrence, 1962
 Ereca triareolata — Roewer, 1961
 Ereca undulata — Sørensen, 1910 — Eastern Africa
 Ereca unicolor — Roewer, 1961

 Erecabia — Roewer, 1940
 Erecabia hartmanni — Roewer, 1940
 Erecabia pluridens — Lawrence, 1962

 Erecella — Roewer, 1935
 Erecella transversalis — Roewer, 1961
 Erecella walikaleana — H. Kauri, 1985 — Zaire
 Erecella basilewskyi — Lawrence, 1962
 Erecella biseriata — Roewer, 1961
 Erecella brunnea — Roewer, 1940 — Ruanda
 Erecella flava — Roewer, 1935
 Erecella lutea — Roewer, 1935
 Erecella nigropicta — Roewer, 1961
 Erecella signata — Roewer, 1950

 Metapygoplus — Roewer, 1923
 Metapygoplus intermedius — (Loman, 1892) — Indonesia (Flores)
 Metapygoplus spinicoxa — Roewer, 1940 — Burma

 Metereca — Roewer, 1923
 Metereca abnormis — (Roewer, 1912) — Tanzania
 Metereca aspersa — Roewer, 1935 — Uganda
 Metereca concolor — Roewer, 1961
 Metereca differens — (Lawrence, 1957)
 Metereca katangana — H. Kauri, 1985 — Zaire
 Metereca kivuana — (Roewer, 1961)
 Metereca kivuna — Roewer, 1961
 Metereca leleupae — H. Kauri, 1985 — Zaire
 Metereca longipes — H. Kauri, 1985 — Zaire
 Metereca minuta — Roewer, 1954
 Metereca montana — (Roewer, 1912) — Eastern Africa
 Metereca papillata — Roewer, 1935 — East Africa
 Metereca paradoxa — H. Kauri, 1985 — Zaire
 Metereca ripensis — H. Kauri, 1985 — Zaire
 Metereca simples — (Roewer, 1952)

 Montereca — Lawrence, 1962
 Montereca paucidens — Lawrence, 1962

 Neobaeorix — Lawrence, 1962
 Neobaeorix cornuta — Lawrence, 1962

 Neocoryphus — Lawrence, 1965
 Neocoryphus niger — Lawrence, 1965

 Neopygoplus — Roewer, 1923
 Neopygoplus jacobsoni — Roewer, 1923 — Sumatra
 Neopygoplus siamensis — S. Suzuki, 1985 — Thailand

 Parapygoplus — Roewer, 1912
 Parapygoplus variatus — (Thorell, 1889) — Burma

 Propygoplus — Roewer, 1923
 Propygoplus maculatus — (Roewer, 1912) — Nepal
 Propygoplus siwalik — Martens, 1977
 Propygoplus rugosa — (Roewer, 1940) — Sikkim
 Propygoplus scabrisoma — (Roewer, 1940) — Sikkim
 Propygoplus tenuipes — (Roewer, 1927) — Sikkim

 Pygoplus — Thorell, 1889
 Pygoplus obscurus — Thorell, 1889 — India (Assam)
 Pygoplus ferrugineus — Thorell, 1889 — India (Assam)
 Pygoplus trifasciatus — Thorell, 1889 — India (Assam)

 Roewereca — Lawrence, 1962
 Roewereca tenebrosa — Lawrence, 1962

 Sacesphorus — Thorell, 1889
 Sacesphorus maculatus — Thorell, 1889 — Burma

 Sijucavernicus — Roewer, 1923
 Sijucavernicus kempi — Roewer, 1923 — cave, India (Assam)

 Simienatus — Roewer, 1956
 Simienatus scotti — Roewer, 1956

 Tarnus — Suzuki, 1969
 Tarnus pulcher — Suzuki, 1969

 Termitereca — Roewer, 1940
 Termitereca singularis — Roewer, 1940

 Tetecus — Roewer, 1935
 Tetecus tenuis — Roewer, 1935

 Thobala — Roewer, 1940
 Thobala lesserti — Roewer, 1940

 Tubereca — Kauri, 1985
 Tubereca biharanguana — H. Kauri, 1985 — Ruanda

 Tundabia — Roewer, 1935
 Tundabia semicaeca — Roewer, 1935
 Tundabia ugandensis — Goodnight & Goodnight, 1959

 Valpara — Roewer, 1929
 Valpara albitarsus — Roewer, 1929

 Vandarawella — Roewer, 1935
 Vandarawella bicolor — Roewer, 1935

 Wintonia — Roewer, 1923
 Wintonia scabra — Roewer, 1923 — Australia

Eupodaucheniinae
Eupodaucheniinae — Roewer, 1935

 Eupodauchenius — Roewer, 1912
 Eupodauchenius luteocruciatus — (Loman, 1910) — Cameroon, "French Guinea"

Hypoxestinae
Hypoxestinae — Roewer, 1935

 Adamauna — Roewer, 1935
 Adamauna maculatipes — Roewer, 1935

 Bandona — Roewer, 1927
 Bandona palpalis — Roewer, 1927 — cave, Thailand
 Bandona boninensis — Gruber, 1974

 Bwitonatus — Roewer, 1950
 Bwitonatus marlieri — Roewer, 1950

 Cleoxestus — Roewer, 1954
 Cleoxestus luteipictus — Roewer, 1954

 Congonella — Roewer, 1935
 Congonella frontalis — Roewer, 1935

 Dicoryphus — Loman, 1902
 Dicoryphus ater — (Lawrence, 1962)
 Dicoryphus furvus — Loman, 1902 — "German East Africa"
 Dicoryphus jeanneli — (Roewer, 1913)
 Dicoryphus melanacanthus — (Loman, 1902) — Eastern Africa

 Doloressus — Roewer, 1935
 Doloressus cippatus — Roewer, 1935
 Doloressus filipes — Lawrence, 1949 — Angola
 Doloressus ghesquierei — (Roewer, 1950)
 Doloressus palmgreni — H. Kauri, 1985 — Zaire

 Dongila — Roewer, 1927
 Dongila silvatica — Roewer, 1927
 Dongila spinosa — Roewer, 1927

 Findia — Roewer, 1915
 Findia atrolutea — Roewer, 1915 — "French Congo", Zaire

 Hypoxestinus — Roewer, 1927
 Hypoxestinus frontalis — Roewer, 1935 — Cameroon
 Hypoxestinus nkogoi — Roewer, 1927 — "French Congo"

 Hypoxestus — Loman, 1902
 Hypoxestus bituberculatus — Lawrence, 1962
 Hypoxestus coxicornis — Roewer, 1940 — Ruanda
 Hypoxestus levis — Loman, 1902
 Hypoxestus patellaris — (Sørensen, 1910) — Kilimanjaro
 Hypoxestus planus — Goodnight & Goodnight, 1959
 Hypoxestus roeweri — Starega, 1992
 Hypoxestus trituberculatus — Lawrence, 1962
 Hypoxestus ealanus — H. Kauri, 1985 — Zaire
 Hypoxestus glaber — H. Kauri, 1985 — Zaire
 Hypoxestus scaphoides — H. Kauri, 1985 — Zaire

 Leleupiolus — Roewer, 1951
 Leleupiolus marmoratus — Roewer, 1951

 Lossida — Roewer, 1935
 Lossida rugosa — Roewer, 1935

 Lossidacola — Roewer, 1935
 Lossidacola pachytarsus — Roewer, 1935

 Mabwella — Roewer, 1952
 Mabwella trochanteralis — Roewer, 1954
 Mabwella wittei — Roewer, 1952

 Mecutina — Roewer, 1935
 Mecutina filipes — Roewer, 1935 — Mozambique
 Mecutina moshinia — Roewer, 1940 — Tanzania

 Metasesostris — Roewer, 1915
 Metasesostris armatus — Roewer, 1915 — Tanzania

 Musola — Roewer, 1927
 Musola longipes — Roewer, 1927 — Bioko

 Nkogoa — Roewer, 1927
 Nkogoa feai — Roewer, 1927

 Parasesostris — Roewer, 1915
 Parasesostris granulatus — Roewer, 1915 — Tanzania

 Parazalmoxis — Roewer, 1913
 Parazalmoxis africana — Roewer, 1913 — Kenya

 Passula — Roewer, 1927
 Passula scabricula — Roewer, 1927 — Malaysia, Pinang Islands

 Podaucheniellus — Roewer, 1927
 Podaucheniellus bipalaris — Roewer, 1927 — Cameroon

 Podauchenius — Sørensen, 1896
 Podauchenius longipes — Sørensen, 1896 — Cameroon

 Randilea — Roewer, 1935
 Randilea scabricula — Roewer, 1935

 Rhabdopygata — Roewer, 1954
 Rhabdopygata mossambica — Roewer, 1954

 Rhabdopygella — Roewer, 1935
 Rhabdopygella ferruginea — Roewer, 1935
 Rhabdopygella laevis — Roewer, 1935

 Rhabdopygus — Roewer, 1912
 Rhabdopygus benoiti — H. Kauri, 1985 — Zaire
 Rhabdopygus fuscus — Roewer, 1912
 Rhabdopygus maculatus — Roewer, 1935 — East Africa
 Rhabdopygus robustus — Lawrence, 1957
 Rhabdopygus rugipalpis — Roewer, 1952
 Rhabdopygus termitarum — Roewer, 1951

 Scabrobunus — Roewer, 1912
 Scabrobunus filipes — Roewer, 1912 — India (Maharashtra)

 Sesostranus — Roewer, 1935
 Sesostranus longipes — Roewer, 1950
 Sesostranus niger — Roewer, 1935

 Sesostrellus — Roewer, 1935
 Sesostrellus gibbosus — H. Kauri, 1985 — Zaire
 Sesostrellus robustus — Roewer, 1935
 Sesostrellus umbonatus — (Roewer, 1935) — Uganda

 Sesostris — Sørensen, 1910
 Sesostris brevipes — H. Kauri, 1985 — Burundi
 Sesostris gracilis — Sørensen, 1910 — Kilimandjaro
 Sesostris insulanus — Roewer, 1912 — Eastern Africa
 Sesostris maculatus — Roewer, 1915 — Eastern Africa
 Sesostris maculifer — H. Kauri, 1985 — Zaire

 Spinixestus — Roewer, 1952
 Spinixestus armatus — Roewer, 1952
 Spinixestus benderanus — H. Kauri, 1985 — Zaire
 Spinixestus leleupi — H. Kauri, 1985 — Zaire
 Spinixestus polycuspidatus — H. Kauri, 1985 — Zaire
 Spinixestus rufus — Roewer, 1952
 Spinixestus siteteus — Roewer, 1961

 Talaspus — Roewer, 1935
 Talaspus spinimanus — Roewer, 1935

 Tusipulla — Roewer, 1935
 Tusipulla coxalis — Roewer, 1935 — Tanzania

 Viglua — Roewer, 1940
 Viglua brunnipes — Roewer, 1940
 Viglua machadoi — Lawrence, 1949
 Viglua machadoi machadoi — Lawrence, 1949
 Viglua machadoi granulosa — Lawrence, 1957
 Viglua machadoi majora — Lawrence, 1949

Irumuinae
Irumuinae — Kauri, 1985

 Irumua — Roewer, 1961
 Irumua caeca — Roewer, 1961 — Zaire
 Irumua bifurcata — [Kauri 1989 ref]

 Machadoessa — Lawrence, 1951
 Machadoessa inops — Lawrence, 1951 — Angola

 Mutadia — Kauri, 1985
 Mutadia bifurcata — H. Kauri, 1985 — Zaire

 Numipedia — Kauri, 1985
 Numipedia subterranea — H. Kauri, 1985 — Zaire

 Typhlobunus — Roewer, 1915
 Typhlobunus troglodytes — Roewer, 1915 — Kenya

Maruinae
Maruinae — Roewer, 1935

 Abanatus — Roewer, 1950
 Abanatus beloti — Roewer, 1950 — Zaire

 Celimba — Roewer, 1940
 Celimba parvula — Roewer, 1940 — Tanzania

 Congonia — Roewer, 1935
 Congonia spinifrons — Roewer, 1935 — Zaire

 Katangania — H. Kauri, 1985
 Katangania monticola — H. Kauri, 1985 — Zaire

 Kituvia — Kauri, 1985
 Kituvia spinifera — H. Kauri, 1985 — Zaire

 Marua — Roewer, 1935
 Marua schenkeli — Roewer, 1935 — Zaire
 Marua spinosa — Roewer, 1935 — Cameroon

 Mwenga — Kauri, 1985
 Mwenga setosa — H. Kauri, 1985 — Zaire

Polycoryphinae
Polycoryphinae — Roewer, 1935

 Anaimalus — Roewer, 1929
 Anaimalus gibbulus — Roewer, 1929 — India (Anaimalai Hills)

 Binderella — Roewer, 1935
 Binderella bistriata — Roewer, 1935
 Binderella paradoxa — (Roewer, 1935) — Cameroon

 Bueana — Roewer, 1927
 Bueana ephippiata — Roewer, 1927 — Cameroon

 Gulufia — Roewer, 1935
 Gulufia frontalis — Roewer, 1935 — Ethiopia

 Harpeuna — Roewer, 1935
 Harpeuna denticulata — Roewer, 1935 — India (Bombay)

 Henriquea — Roewer, 1927
 Henriquea spinigera — Roewer, 1927 — Principe

 Karalaica — Roewer, 1927
 Karalaica atroscutata — Roewer, 1927 — India (Kerala)

 Kodaika — Roewer, 1929
 Kodaika escheri — Roewer, 1929 — India (Upper Palnis)

 Koyna — Roewer, 1915
 Koyna spinulata — Roewer, 1915 — India

 Maracandellus — Roewer, 1923
 Maracandellus rhinoceros — (Thorell, 1889) — Burma
 Maracandellus bidentatus — S. Suzuki, 1985 — Thailand

 Maracandinus — Roewer, 1912
 Maracandinus rubrofemoratus — (Pavesi, 1895) — Ethiopia

 Maracandus — Simon, 1879
 Maracandus macei — Simon, 1879 — Bangladesh
 Maracandus monhoti — Simon, 1879 — Cambodia

 Mormuga — Roewer, 1927
 Mormuga uncifrons — Roewer, 1927 — India (Mormugao Bay)

 Mudumalus — Roewer, 1929
 Mudumalus partialis — Roewer, 1929 — India (Nilgiris)

 Oppalnia — Roewer, 1927
 Oppalnia brevipes — Roewer, 1927 — India (Nilgiri Palni)

 Paktongius — Suzuki, 1969
 Paktongius distinctus — Suzuki, 1969 — Thailand

 Palmanella — Roewer, 1927
 Palmanella tigrina — Roewer, 1927

 Panchganius — Roewer, 1935
 Panchganius blatteri — Roewer, 1935 — India (Satara)

 Parakodaika — Goodnight & Goodnight, 1944
 Parakodaika angolae — Goodnight & Goodnight, 1944 — Angola

 Paramaracandus — Suzuki, 1976
 Paramaracandus fuscus — Suzuki, 1976
 Paramaracandus sexdentatus — S. Suzuki, 1985 — Thailand

 Pashokia — Roewer, 1927
 Pashokia laeviscutum — Roewer, 1927 — eastern Himalaya
 Pashokia maxima — Martens, 1977
 Pashokia mutatrix — Martens, 1977
 Pashokia rufa — Roewer, 1935 — Burma
 Pashokia silhavyi — Martens, 1977
 Pashokia yamadai — Suzuki, 1970

 Phalcochina — Roewer, 1927
 Phalcochina albistriata — Roewer, 1927 — India (Kerala)

 Polycoryphus — Loman, 1902
 Polycoryphus asper — Loman, 1902 — Namibia, South Africa

 Procoryphus — Roewer, 1950
 Procoryphus multispinatus — Roewer, 1950
 Procoryphus straeleni — Roewer, 1952

 Pulchrandus — H. Kauri, 1985
 Pulchrandus longimanus — H. Kauri, 1985 — Zaire

 Pykara — Roewer, 1929
 Pykara coxalis — Roewer, 1929

 Santhomea — Roewer, 1927
 Santhomea scabra — Roewer, 1927

 Senarba — Roewer, 1927
 Senarba rudicoxa — Roewer, 1927
 Senarba acanthicoxa — Roewer, 1927

 Sonega — Roewer, 1935
 Sonega scutata — Roewer, 1935

 Thomecola — Roewer, 1935
 Thomecola quadrispina — (Roewer, 1927)

 Uviranus — Kauri, 1985
 Uviranus echinops — H. Kauri, 1985 — Zaire

 Yadoa — Roewer, 1936
 Yadoa feae — Roewer, 1936

 Zirolana — Roewer, 1940
 Zirolana lutea — Roewer, 1940

Selencinae
Selencinae — Roewer, 1935

 Cassinia — Roewer, 1927
 Cassinia macrochelis — Roewer, 1927

 Euselenca — Roewer, 1923
 Euselenca feai — Roewer, 1927 — Fr.Congo
 Euselenca gracilis — (Sørensen, 1896) — Cameroon

 Humbea — Roewer, 1935
 Humbea bimaculata — Roewer, 1935

 Jaundea — Roewer, 1935
 Jaundea spinulata — (Roewer, 1912) — Cameroon

 Metaselenca — Roewer, 1912
 Metaselenca halbum — (Loman, 1910) — Cameroon

 Paraselenca — Roewer, 1923
 Paraselenca aculeata — (Roewer, 1912) — Togo, Cameroon
 Paraselenca hispida — (Roewer, 1912) — Togo, Cameroon
 Paraselenca marginata — Roewer, 1935 — Cameroon
 Paraselenca simonis — Sørensen, 1932 — West Africa

 Sassandria — Roewer, 1912
 Sassandria bicolor — Roewer, 1912 — Ivory Coast
 Sassandria tenuipes — Lawrence, 1965

 Selenca — Sørensen, 1896
 Selenca maculata — Sørensen, 1896 — Cameroon, Togo

 Selencasta — Roewer, 1935
 Selencasta minuscula — (Roewer, 1927) — Bioko

 Selencula — Roewer, 1935
 Selencula filipes — (Roewer, 1927) — Bioko

 Seuthesplus — Roewer, 1935
 Seuthesplus nigeriensis — Roewer, 1935 — Nigeria
 Seuthesplus perarmatus — Lawrence, 1965

 Seuthessus — Kauri, 1985
 Seuthessus pustulatus — H. Kauri, 1985 — Zaire

 Umbonimba — Roewer, 1953
 Umbonimba acanthops — Roewer, 1953

Sidaminae
Sidaminae — Roewer, 1935

 Amhara — Pavesi, 1897
 Amhara grata — Pavesi, 1897 — Somali
 Amhara nigrescens — (Roewer, 1935) — Ethiopia

 Blantyrea — Roewer, 1912
 Blantyrea armata — Roewer, 1912 — Malawi

 Bundelkhandia — Turk, 1945
 Bundelkhandia cavernicola — Turk, 1945

 Congolla — Roewer, 1935
 Congolla hispidipalpus — Roewer, 1935

 Edeala — Roewer, 1927
 Edeala palpiplus — Roewer, 1927

 Eusidama — Roewer, 1913
 Eusidama minima — Roewer, 1913 — Kilimandjaro, Tanzania

 Fizibius — Roewer, 1961
 Fizibius proprius — Roewer, 1961

 Indosidama — Turk, 1945
 Indosidama moila — Turk, 1945 — cave

 Lisposidama — Lawrence, 1962
 Lisposidama filipes — Lawrence, 1962

 Lukundamila — Roewer, 1961
 Lukundamila cookei — Roewer, 1961

 Metasidama — Roewer, 1915
 Metasidama ephippiata — Roewer, 1915 — Tanzania
 Metasidama gracilis — Lawrence, 1962

 Neosidama — Roewer, 1915
 Neosidama longipes — Roewer, 1915 — Tanzania

 Orsimonia — Roewer, 1935
 Orsimonia filipes — Roewer, 1935
 Orsimonia gracillimus — (Roewer, 1935)

 Scabrosidama — Lawrence, 1962
 Scabrosidama serratichelis — Lawrence, 1962

 Sidama — Pavesi, 1895
 Sidama moesta — Pavesi, 1895 — East Africa
 Sidama abessinica — Roewer, 1912 — Ethiopia
 Sidama spinger — (Roewer, 1935) — Ethiopia

 Vilhena — Lawrence, 1949
 Vilhena delicata — Lawrence, 1949

Footnotes

References
 Joel Hallan's Biology Catalog: Assamiidae
  (eds.) (2007): Harvestmen - The Biology of Opiliones. Harvard University Press 

Assamiidae
Assamiidae